The 1864 United States presidential election in Ohio was held on November 8, 1864 as part of the 1864 United States presidential election. State voters chose 21 electors to the Electoral College, who voted for president and vice president.

Ohio was won by the National Union Party candidate, incumbent Republican President Abraham Lincoln, who won the state with 56.37% of the popular vote. The Democratic Party candidate, George B. McClellan, garnered 43.63% of the popular vote.

Results

Results by county

See also
 United States presidential elections in Ohio

References

Ohio
1864
1864 Ohio elections